Pachythamnus is a genus of Mesoamerican flowering plants in the tribe Eupatorieae within the family Asteraceae.

Species
The only known species is Pachythamnus crassirameus, native to Guatemala, Nicaragua, El Salvador, and central and southern Mexico.

Etymology
Ageratina is derived from Greek meaning 'un-aging', in reference to the flowers keeping their color for a long time. This name was used by Dioscorides for a number of different plants.

References

Eupatorieae
Monotypic Asteraceae genera
Flora of North America